Leopold Hofmann (31 October 1905 – 9 January 1976) was an Austrian football midfielder who played for Austria in the 1934 FIFA World Cup. He also played for First Vienna FC.

Statistics

International

International goals
As of match played 24 October 1937. Austria score listed first, score column indicates score after each Hofmann goal.

References

External links
FIFA profile

1905 births
1976 deaths
Austrian footballers
Austria international footballers
Association football midfielders
First Vienna FC players
1934 FIFA World Cup players
Footballers from Vienna
Austrian football managers
First Vienna FC managers